Kimyacıoğlu is a Turkish surname. Notable people with the surname include:

 Şebnem Kimyacıoğlu (born 1983), Turkish-American basketball player
 Yasemin Kimyacıoğlu (born 1985), Turkish-American basketball player

Turkish-language surnames